USS Marvin Shields (FF-1066) was a  of the US Navy. The ship was named after the only Seabee to receive the Medal of Honor. CM3 Marvin Glenn Shields was awarded the Medal of Honor during the Vietnam War.

Construction 
Marvin Shields (DD‑1066) was laid down 12 April 1968, by Todd Pacific Shipyards, Seattle, Washington; launched 23 October 1969, and delivered 1 April 1971; cosponsored by Mrs. Victoria Cassalery and Mrs. Richard A. Bennett; commissioned 10 April 1971 by Capt William J. Hunter.

Design and description
The Knox-class design was derived from the  modified to extend range and without a long-range missile system. They displaced  at full load. Their crew consisted of 13 officers and 211 enlisted men.

The ships were equipped with one Westinghouse geared steam turbine that drove the single propeller shaft.

The Knox-class ships were armed with a 5"/54 caliber Mark 42 gun forward and a single 3-inch/50-caliber gun aft. They mounted an eight-round RUR-5 ASROC launcher between the 5-inch (127 mm) gun and the bridge. Close-range anti-submarine defense was provided by two twin  Mk 32 torpedo tubes. The ships were equipped with a torpedo-carrying DASH drone helicopter; its telescoping hangar and landing pad were positioned amidships aft of the mack. Beginning in the 1970s, the DASH was replaced by a SH-2 Seasprite LAMPS I helicopter and the hangar and landing deck were accordingly enlarged. Most ships also had the 3-inch (76 mm) gun replaced by an eight-cell BPDMS missile launcher in the early 1970s.

Service history
1983 Deployment

On 20 July 1983, the New York Times reported that the Marvin Shields along with seven other vessels in the Carrier Ranger Battle Group left San Diego on Friday, 15 July 1983, and were headed for the West Pacific when they were rerouted and ordered to steam for Central America to conduct training and flight operations in areas off the coasts of Nicaragua, El Salvador, and Honduras as part of major military exercises planned for that summer.

Marvin Shields was commissioned 10 April 1971, decommissioned 2 July 1992, and struck 11 January 1995. She was subsequently transferred to Mexican Navy and renamed ARM Abasolo.

Notes

References

External links

 

Ships built in Seattle
Knox-class frigates
Ships transferred from the United States Navy to the Mexican Navy
1969 ships
Cold War frigates and destroyer escorts of the United States